Rétság is a district in western part of Nógrád County. Rétság is also the name of the town where the district seat is found. The district is located in the Northern Hungary Statistical Region.

Geography 
Rétság District borders with Balassagyarmat District to the northeast, Vác District (Pest County) to the south, Szob District (Pest County) to the west. The number of the inhabited places in Rétság District is 25.

Municipalities 
The district has 1 town and 24 villages.
(ordered by population, as of 1 January 2013)

The bolded municipality is the city.

Demographics

In 2011, it had a population of 24,395 and the population density was 56/km².

Ethnicity
Besides the Hungarian majority, the main minorities are the Slovak (approx. 1,300), German and Roma (850).

Total population (2011 census): 24,395
Ethnic groups (2011 census): Identified themselves: 24,864 persons:
Hungarians: 21,569 (86.75%)
Slovaks: 1,337 (5.38%)
Germans: 841 (3.38%)
Gypsies: 839 (3.37%)
Others and indefinable: 278 (1.12%)
Approx. 500 persons in Rétság District did declare more than one ethnic group at the 2011 census.

Religion
Religious adherence in the county according to 2011 census:

Catholic – 13,646 (Roman Catholic – 13,567; Greek Catholic – 77);
Evangelical – 1,749; 
Reformed – 1,339; 
other religions – 351; 
Non-religious – 1,743; 
Atheism – 168;
Undeclared – 5,399.

Gallery

See also
List of cities and towns of Hungary

References

External links
 Postal codes of the Rétság District

Districts in Nógrád County